The Waterview Tunnel is a twin road tunnel in central Auckland, New Zealand. The tunnel, with three lanes of road vehicle traffic in each direction, connects State Highway 20 in the south at Mount Roskill to State Highway 16 in the west at Point Chevalier as part of the Waterview Connection. Its opening completed the Western Ring Route motorway system.

Planning history 
The project had an extensive planning history, with the earliest consultation in 2000, though the proposal for a route roughly in the area dates from much earlier.

Purpose 
The Waterview Tunnel completed the Western Ring Route which provides a second route through Auckland. For those travelling from North to South (or vice versa) the route enables users to bypass the city centre and reduces reliance on SH1 and the Auckland Harbour Bridge. It also provides a direct motorway link from the central city through to Auckland Airport, a route which has in the past relied on the use of local roads.

Project alliance 
The Waterview Tunnel and greater Waterview Connection project was delivered by the Well-Connected Alliance. This was a partnership between the NZ Transport Agency, Fletcher Construction, McConnell Dowell, Parsons Brinckerhoff, Beca Infrastructure, Tonkin+Taylor, and Obayashi Corporation. Wilson Tunnelling and  SICE were sub-alliance partners.

Construction

Concrete lining 
A purpose-built factory was constructed in East Tāmaki to produce the 2414 concrete rings needed to line the tunnels. Each ring is two metres wide (length) and 14 metres in diameter. They consist of 10 precast segments, each of which weighs 10.5 tonnes.  Five rejected segments were used to create a Soldiers Memorial on the Village Green at Te Kauwhata.

Tunnel boring machine 

An Earth Pressure Balance tunnel boring machine (TBM) was built specifically for the Waterview Tunnel at the Herrenknecht factory, Guangzhou, China. Made up of 90 pieces, the TBM was 14 metres in diameter, 97 metres long, and had a top speed of 80mm per minute. The TBM arrived in Auckland on 22 July 2013, a launch ceremony was held on 31 October 2013, and excavation work began on 8 November 2013.

Nicknamed "Alice" following a public vote, the TBM was the 11th largest machine of this type in the world. Alice bored the twin tunnels in two passes to a depth of up to 45 metres so as to pass below hard rock, the water table, and sea level. The southbound tunnel, excavated from south to north, was holed through on 29 September 2014. Alice completed the return journey on 19 October 2015 and was dismantled in early 2016 before being transported in sections to the Port of Auckland for shipment back to the German manufacturer.

Cross-passage excavation 
Work on the excavation of cross-passages between the two tunnels began in early 2015. Sixteen cross-passages were built to enable evacuation  of people from one tunnel to the other in the event of an emergency and to house tunnel operation equipment. Each cross-passage is around 11 metres long. The excavation was completed in December 2015.

Safety features 
The tunnels include a number of features to ensure safe use by vehicles. Safety features include electronic message boards, speed cameras, public address systems, radio sound systems, CCTV cameras, and ventilation and fire sprinkler systems. Traffic is monitored by dedicated Tunnel Operators and computerised systems. Emergency exits and telephones are installed every 150 metres along the length of each tunnel. Overheight detection systems prevent oversize vehicles entering, and on-ramp signals regulate traffic flow.

Closures and detour route 
The tunnels will be partially or fully closed for scheduled maintenance at times, usually between the hours of 10pm and 5am. A detour route through Great North Road, Blockhouse Bay Road, Tiverton Road, New Windsor Road, and Maioro Street will be utilised at these times. The detour will also be permanently in place for prohibited vehicles.

Prohibited vehicles 
Dangerous Goods Vehicles (i.e. those requiring a placard), vehicles over 4.3m high, and vehicles carrying uncovered loads are prohibited from using the tunnels. They are required to take the detour route.

Completion date 
In 2016, the completion date for Waterview Tunnel was estimated as mid-April 2017. A delay was announced in March 2017, with the date pushed out by "two-three months" after faults were found in the deluge system and software. On 11 June 2017 it was announced that the tunnel would open in early July 2017. The tunnels opened on 2 July 2017 with the first cars passing through at 12:47 am escorted by three police vehicles.

Te Haerenga Hou (artwork) 
Auckland artist Graham Tipene created an artwork named Te Haerenga Hou (meaning New Journey) for the entranceway to the tunnel.

The artwork depicts the journey from the Manukau Harbour, past the volcanoes of Te Ara Pūeru /Māngere, Te Hōpua (Gloucester Park), Maungakiekie (One Tree Hill) and Puketāpapa (Mt Roskill), to the feet of Ōwairaka (Mt Albert), following the path of the tunnels. The work also incorporates the story of lovers Tamaireia and Hinemairangi, whose elopement is said to have led to the creation of the region's volcanoes.

See also 
 List of motorways, expressways, and highways in Auckland

References

External links 
 https://www.nzta.govt.nz/waterview-tunnel/

Buildings and structures in Auckland
Road tunnels in New Zealand
Transport buildings and structures in the Auckland Region